The Russian Association of Indigenous Peoples of the North (RAIPON) is the Russian national umbrella organisation representing 40 indigenous small-numbered peoples of the North, Siberia and the Far East as well as the Komy-Ishma people. It is a non-governmental organisation in Consultative Status with ECOSOC and one of the six indigenous Permanent Participants of the Arctic Council.

History 

RAIPON was founded 31 March 1990 at the occasion of the first "Congress of the peoples of the North of the Soviet Union" and registered under the name of "Association of the Peoples of the North of the USSR". It was initially headed by the Nivkh writer Vladimir Sangi. In 1993, it was re-registered as a social and political movement by the name of "Association of indigenous small-numbered peoples of the North, Siberia and the Far East of the Russian Federation" and the Khanty author Yeremey Aypin became its president. Later he was replaced by the Nenets Sergey Kharyuchi, who is also the speaker of the Duma of Yamal-Nenets Autonomous Okrug. He was re-elected president of RAIPON in 2001, 2005 and 2009. In 1999 RAIPON  was awarded the status of an All-Russian Non-Governmental Organisation by the Russian Ministry of Justice, which i.a. made its representatives eligible to be appointed to the Public Chamber of Russia. By 2012, RAIPON's long-serving vice-president Pavel Sulyandziga served a second term as a member of the Public Chamber.  November 2012, Russia's Ministry of Justice ordered the closure of RAIPON, because of an “alleged lack of correspondence between the association’s statutes and federal law”. According to Russia's Ministry of Justice the indigenous peoples association will be closed for six months, whereupon the statutes will have to be adjusted. In March 2013, RAIPON elected Grigory Petrovich Ledkov as president; Ledkov also sits as a representative in the Russian Duma.

Structure 

The highest decision-making body is the Congress of indigenous small-numbered peoples of the North, which is held every four years. The VI congress was held in April 2009. Between the congresses, the steering body is the Coordinating Council, comprising regional indigenous leaders. The organization's headquarters are located in Moscow.

Former leaders 
Dmitry Berezhkov, former vice president. Arrested lawfully in 2013 in Tromsø on behalf of Russia, thereafter released.
Pavel Sulyandziga, former vice president.

See also 
 Global 500 Roll of Honour

References

External links 
  (In Russian)

Indigenous organizations in Russia
Organizations established in 1990
1990 establishments in Russia